Canadian Pacific's Galt Subdivision is Canadian Pacific's 114.6 mile long section of its Montréal-Detroit freight corridor. It is located in Southern Ontario, Canada. Getting its name from the historic City of Galt (now the City of Cambridge) that it passes through, the track runs from the bustling hub of Toronto, Ontario, to London, Ontario. GO Transit's Milton GO train service operates on this line from Toronto Union Station to Milton GO station. The rest of the line plays host to mixed freight and intermodal traffic, from Toronto to termini like Detroit, and Chicago. This Central Ontario line also had CP passenger rail service till 1971 when it was eliminated. Passenger rail service would be partly restored halfway through the line through the introduction of GO Transit operations in 1981 westward only as far as the Town of Milton.

GO Transit Operations 

On October 27, 1981, GO Transit began running loaded passenger trains from Union Station to Milton GO station, then deadheading to Guelph Junction. This process was reversed in the mornings. These trains are powered by the MPI MP40PH-3C locomotives, and haul 12 Bombardier BiLevel passenger coaches. The stations along the line are (from Milton east to Union):
 Milton
 Lisgar
 Meadowvale
 Streetsville
 Erindale
 Cooksville
 Dixie
 Kipling
 Union
More recently, GO Transit has stopped deadheading their trains to Guelph Junction for overnight and weekend storage - they have built a yard just west of 5th line in Milton, with a connecting siding directly from the GO station. There are 10 trains operating on a weekday basis, to Toronto in the mornings, and to Milton in the evenings. GO does not operate any "express" service on their Milton Line.

Since the loss of passenger rail service to the City of Galt in 1971, taxpayers, community leaders and politicians from the City of Cambridge have been lobbying the provincial government for decades for the restoration of passenger rail service. This issue is still ongoing as Cambridge is the largest city in Ontario without passenger rail service.

Canadian Pacific freight operations 
CP runs several freight trains in both ways along almost the full length of the subdivision. They do not run the full length of the line, as the portion that ran south-east to Union Station was sold to Metrolinx/GO transit. From Lambton Yard west, freight traffic begins on the Galt Subdivision. More recently around October 2010, unit trains have commenced operation on the Galt sub. These ethanol trains come in the way of train ID numbers 650 as eastbound loaded movements, with 651 being the westbound empty return movements. There are many other trains as well, such as manifests, intermodals, double-stacks, autorackers, and even the almost-weekly Expressway train. Regulated operating speeds on the Galt Subdivision range from 50-60 mph/80–96 km/h.

See also

 Rail transport in Ontario

References

 
Canadian Pacific Railway lines in Ontario
Rail infrastructure in Mississauga
Rail infrastructure in the Regional Municipality of Waterloo
Rail transport in Cambridge, Ontario
North Dumfries
Rail transport in Oxford County, Ontario
Rail transport in Woodstock, Ontario
Rail infrastructure in Middlesex County, Ontario
Rail infrastructure in London, Ontario